The Seattle Aquarium is a public aquarium in Seattle, Washington, United States, located on Pier 59 on the Elliott Bay waterfront. It opened in 1977 and has been accredited by the Association of Zoos and Aquariums (AZA).

History

Plans for a city aquarium, replacing an existing private aquarium, were approved by voters in a 1968 Forward Thrust ballot initiative. The Seattle City Council approved a site near Golden Gardens Park in Ballard in April 1971, but reversed its decision months later following public outcry. A site on the north side of Pier 59 was instead chosen the following year, necessitating the demolition of additional piers, and was originally expected to begin construction in 1974 but was delayed by design revisions. The new aquarium was part of a large redevelopment program for the Alaskan Way promenade, which also included Waterfront Park and viewpoints.

Construction began in early 1975 with the driving of piles into the seabed to support the future aquarium structure. The aquarium opened on May 20, 1977, and attracted 1,524 visitors on its first day. It cost $5.4 million to construct and was initially owned and operated by the City of Seattle's Department of Parks and Recreation. The opening ceremonies included the release of salmon fingerlings into Elliott Bay and a three-day festival on the waterfront. Bassetti/Norton/Metler/Rekevics were the architects for the building; the exhibits were designed in consultation with local scientists, including Pacific Science Center director and later governor Dixy Lee Ray.The aquarium's first expansion was announced in 1979 and was followed by a new exhibit in 1986. A $25.4 million expansion was rejected by Seattle voters in 1988 after failing to reach a needed supermajority. On July 1, 2010, the nonprofit Seattle Aquarium Society—the official 501(c)(3) nonprofit organization for the aquarium—assumed management of the institution from the city. The aquarium promotes marine conservation and educates over 800,000 visitors each year (including 50,000 students) on the impact of mankind on marine life. It also conducts research in these fields. In 2007, an  expansion added a  gift store and café to the aquarium, as well as two new exhibits: Window on Washington Waters and Crashing Waves.

In 2019, the Aquarium Society announced plans for a major expansion, named the Ocean Pavilion, that is set to open in 2024. The project includes a new waterfront promenade that ties in with redevelopment of Alaskan Way (which includes an overpass to Pike Place Market) as well as  tank for sharks and sting rays. The project is expected to cost $160 million with the majority of funds coming from local, state and federal taxes, private donations, and other sources. The city government initially approved $34 million in funding from a real estate excise tax but also contributed a $20 million loan in 2022 to fill an expected shortfall, stemming in part from the project being massively over budget.

Exhibits

Window on Washington Waters is a  tank created as part of the 2007 expansion. There are dive shows which take place several times a day. Divers wearing special masks are able to converse with visitors.

Life on the Edge was opened in 2002. Two large exhibit pools that include touch zones allow visitors to see the tidepool life of Washington's outer coast and of Seattle's inland sea.
Pacific Coral Reef is a man-made coral reef in a  tank that contains fish that live in and around reefs.
Ocean Oddities is an exhibit displaying pinecone fish, cowfish, flying gurnards, potbellied seahorses, and short dragonfish.
Birds and Shores consists of three separate areas. Northwest Shores is an area which shows birds in a variety of habitats of the coastal Northwest.  Alcids has diving birds such as tufted puffins and common murres. There is also a Shorebird exhibit.
The Marine Mammals area includes exhibits for harbor seals, Northern fur seals, sea otters, and river otters, as well as the Orca Family Activity Center. The Orca Family Activity Center is meant to educate visitors about orcas, particularly those belonging to the Southern Resident Community residing in Puget Sound.
Puget Sound Fish is a three-part exhibit that contains fish from the Puget Sound. Fish included in the tank are grunt sculpins, Pacific spiny lumpsuckers, midshipman fish, canary rockfish, wolf eels, and decorated warbonnets.

The Underwater Dome is an exhibit viewed from a mostly transparent spherical undersea room in a  tank. It was built as part of the original construction and opened in 1977. The tank exhibits species that would be found in Puget Sound including salmon, lingcod, sharks, sturgeon, skates, and rockfish.

Conservation 

The Seattle Aquarium has participated in conservation efforts of various marine species by collaborating with indigenous peoples, governments, institutions, and companies. In 2020, the Seattle Aquarium cofounded ReShark, an international conservation coalition, aiding in the recovery of zebra sharks in Indonesia. In 2021, the aquarium began to rear larval and juvenile pinto abalones, planning to release them each spring after 2022 into designated sites around the San Juan Islands and Strait of Juan de Fuca.

In popular culture
A fictionalized Seattle Aquarium is prominently featured in the 2020 action-adventure game The Last of Us Part II.

Notes

External links

 

1977 establishments in Washington (state)
Aquaria in Washington (state)
Buildings and structures in Seattle
Central Waterfront, Seattle
Culture of Seattle
Tourist attractions in Seattle
Zoos established in 1977